Raymond William Robert Gravell (12 September 1951 – 31 October 2007) was a Welsh rugby union centre who played club rugby for Llanelli RFC.
At international level, Gravell earned 23 caps for Wales and was selected for the 1980 British Lions tour to South Africa.

In his later career he became a respected broadcaster and occasional actor. Gravell was also a member of the Gorsedd of Bards, an honour bestowed on him for his contribution to the Welsh language. At the Eisteddfodau Gravell was known by his bardic name Ray o'r Mynydd and was given the ceremonial role of Grand Sword Bearer.

Early life and education

Born in Kidwelly, Carmarthenshire, the son of a collier, Gravell moved to Mynydd-y-Garreg at a young age with his family. Gravell was educated at Burry Port Secondary Modern School and Carmarthen Grammar School.

Rugby career

He first played for Llanelli RFC in 1970 and was a member of the team that beat a formidable touring All Blacks side in October 1972, eventually going on to captain the club for two seasons from 1980 to 1982. He made his first appearance for Wales against France in 1975 and played in two Grand Slam winning sides, usually as a centre but sometimes as a winger. Gravell was selected to play for the British and Irish Lions in their 1980 tour of South Africa; he came on as a substitute in the first test and was in the starting line up for the next three tests. In the second test at Bloemfontein, Gravell scored his second international try, though the tourists lost 26–19 to the South Africans.

Gravell also played 12 games for invitational touring team the Barbarians. First selected in 1975, Gravell faced an Australia XV at the start of 1976 before joining the Barbarian tour of Canada later that year where he played in six matches. In 1977 Gravell played his final match for the Barbarians in a star-studded team that faced the returning 1977 British Lions in a charity match to celebrate the Silver Jubilee of Elizabeth II. Although Gravell ended on the losing team, he scored one of three tries for the Barbarians in a game seen as a classic encounter.

Often epitomising the hard edge of rugby, Gravell was the classic crash ball centre, thriving on the physical contact of the sport. He is often cited as the source for the much repeated rugby phrase, "get your first tackle in early, even if it's late."

He announced his retirement from international rugby in 1982, and he played his last match for Llanelli in 1985 having played 485 times and scored 120 tries for the club. He was president of Llanelli RFC from 1998 and of the Llanelli Scarlets regional team from their formation in 2003 until his death.

Broadcasting and acting career

In 1985, he joined the BBC taking the leading role in Bonner, a BBC Cymru film for the Welsh language broadcaster S4C. He appeared in the BBC TV movie Filipina Dreamgirls, and this led to a role in the 1992 Louis Malle film Damage as the chauffeur of the character played by Jeremy Irons. In the same year, 1992, Gravell appeared alongside Peter O'Toole in Rebecca's Daughters, a British comedy film directed by Karl Francis that was based on a story by Dylan Thomas. The film also starred Joely Richardson and Paul Rhys. He also played a gypsy in the 1996 Welsh cult horror film Darklands directed by Julian Richards and starring Craig Fairbrass and Jon Finch.

He presented regular chat and entertainment shows for both BBC Radio Wales and BBC Radio Cymru. Up until his death, he was a member of the BBC's Welsh language rugby commentary team, serving as the pitchside reporter for Celtic League, Powergen Cup and Heineken Cup matches. He hosted a breakfast radio show on Radio Cymru in West Wales and co-hosted I'll Show You Mine with Frank Hennessy on Radio Wales.

Ray Gravell was "rugby consultant" and appeared as "Referee No. 1" in the film Up 'n' Under. He  appeared in the Wales episode of Floyd on Britain and Ireland (1988) where he joined Keith Floyd in the kitchen, commented on some career highlights, and translated ingredients into Welsh.

Personal life and death
Gravell and his wife Mari lived in Mynydd-y-garreg, Carmarthenshire, with their two daughters, Manon and Gwenan, on a street named after him, Heol Ray Gravell (Ray Gravell Road). His father had committed suicide when Gravell was a young man.

In 2000 he was diagnosed with diabetes and ill-health plagued his later years. On 18 April 2007, it was announced that he had been readmitted to hospital following an operation to amputate two toes as a result of a diabetes-related infection, and his right leg was amputated below the knee. Because of the operation, Gravell was unable to continue his bardic duties as the Grand Sword Bearer. The ceremonial role was passed on to fellow international rugby union player Robin McBryde. In the following months, Gravell continued public duties, including appearances on television and at the Urdd Gobaith Cymru.

Six months after the operation and 35 years to the day after Llanelli's famous win over the All Blacks, Gravell died of a heart attack, aged 56. He was taken ill on 31 October 2007 while on a family holiday in Spain, but did not recover and died late that night. After his death tributes were led by Welsh Rugby Union chief executive, Roger Lewis, who said "We are all in total shock because Ray was so full of life even through the difficult health problems he suffered recently. We will miss him as a rugby legend but more importantly, we will miss Ray as a great friend and a fine, family man."

Tributes and funeral
At the time of his death, Gravell was mentoring ex-Welsh Guardsman and war hero Simon Weston in the BBC Wales 'reality' TV show The Big Welsh Challenge, in which a team of five celebrities were tasked with mastering the Welsh language in just 12 months. Weston made the decision to pull out of the show as he felt unable to continue without his friend of 20 years.

On 15 March 2008 at the final match of the Six Nations Championship, Gravell's daughters Gwenan and Manon were asked to lead the Wales team on to the pitch at the Millennium Stadium in Cardiff, carrying the Triple Crown plate Wales had won in their previous match. During the game itself, Wales' kicking coach, Neil Jenkins along with other members of the coaching staff and players wore number 13 shirts bearing Gravell's name. Wales won the match 29–12 securing their 10th Grand Slam, just Wales' second since Gravell himself had won it in 1978.

A public funeral was held at Stradey Park on 15 November 2007, attended by up to ten thousand mourners from all over Wales. Gravell's flag-draped coffin was carried on to the field by six Llanelli players, from past and present, and placed on a red carpet as the ceremony was conducted. Tributes were given in both Welsh and English by First Minister for Wales Rhodri Morgan and by a number of friends and colleagues. During the ceremony, the scoreboard read "Llanelli 9 Seland Newydd 3", as it did at the end of that famous match in 1972. After the ceremony, the coffin was given a guard of honour by both the current Llanelli Scarlets squad and the remaining members of the 1972 Llanelli RFC team that beat the All Blacks. Following the public service, Gravell's family and close friends conducted a private ceremony at Llanelli Crematorium.

References

External links
Obituary in The Times, 2 November 2007

Photo at sporting-heroes

Ray Gravell interview at the Wales Video Gallery

1951 births
2007 deaths
Barbarian F.C. players
Bards of the Gorsedd
British & Irish Lions rugby union players from Wales
Deaths from diabetes
Llanelli RFC players
Rugby union centres
Rugby union players from Kidwelly
Welsh amputees
Wales international rugby union players
Welsh radio presenters
Welsh rugby union players
Welsh sports broadcasters